Lake Genval is an artificial lake located in Belgium on the border between Flanders and Wallonia, southeast of Brussels near the Sonian Forest, which is a part of the municipalities of Rixensart, Walloon Brabant and Overijse, Flemish Brabant. A popular vacation and holiday destination, the lake is surrounded by turn-of-the-century homes built during the Belle Époque. Situated on the lake's south is the Château du Lac, a five-star hotel, restaurant, and bar.

External links 

Genval
Genval
Genval
Landforms of Flemish Brabant
Landforms of Walloon Brabant
Overijse
Rixensart
Belle Époque